Diego Ramos may refer to:

Persons
 Diego César Ramos (born 1972) Argentinian actor
 Diego Fernández de Cevallos Ramos (born 1941) Mexican politician
 Diego Ramos (archer), an Ecuadorian archer, see Ecuador at the 2011 Pan American Games
 Diego Ramos (driver), a Brazilian race car driver, see 2017 Formula 3 Brasil season and 2018 Stock Car Light season and 2019 Stock Car Light season
 Diego Ramos (runner), a Chilean sprinter, see 2007 South American Junior Championships in Athletics
 Diego Ramos de Orozco (16th century) Spanish conquistador in Puerto Rico, for whom Sierra de Orozco in the Cordillera Central is named, and builder of the Castillo San Felipe del Morro

Fictional characters
 Diego Ramos (Dark Fate), a Terminator franchise character from Terminator: Dark Fate
 Diego "Wolf" Ramos (Descendants of the Sun), a character from the Filipino adaptation of the Korean TV show, see Descendants of the Sun (Philippine TV series)

See also

 
 Diego (disambiguation)
 Ramos (disambiguation)